Charles Gorry (18 September 1878 – 13 September 1950) was an Australian cricketer. He played nineteen first-class matches for New South Wales between 1907/08 and 1910/11.

See also
 List of New South Wales representative cricketers

References

External links
 

1878 births
1950 deaths
Australian cricketers
New South Wales cricketers
Cricketers from Auckland
New Zealand emigrants to Australia